The Wick Mountains are a range within New Zealand's Fiordland National Park, the country's biggest national park. Their highest peak is Mount Elliot , and this can be seen in fine weather from the Milford Track, a popular tourist walking track.

Geography

The range is bounded by the Arthur River to the west, Milford Sound (Piopiotahi) and the valley of the Cleddau River to the west, the Homer Saddle, which separates them from the Darren Mountains to the north west and the valleys of the Neil Burn and Clinton River to the south. The Homer Tunnel lies under the north eastern extreme of the range. 

Sheerdown Peak in the range is at the southern end of Milford Sound rising above the airport flat.

The mountains were named by Donald Sutherland after his birthplace in Caithness, Scotland.

Geology
The Wick Mountains are predominantly composed of a biotite from volcanic diorite dated just to their north to 138 ± 2.9 Ma and with younger intusion dykes of say quartz monzodiorite dated at 136 ± 1.9 Ma. These rocks are part of the Median Tectonic Zone that separates the Western and Eastern provinces of Zealandia rocks. The mountains also have components to their southwest of orthogneiss.

Climbing 
Some of the mountains have known mountain climbing routes on what has been described as "amazing diorite".

References

Mountain ranges of Fiordland
Fiordland National Park